Olimpiada Neapolis FC FC was a football team based in Neapoli, Nicosia, Cyprus. It had been a refugee club since the 1974 Turkish invasion of Cyprus, when Turkey occupied the northern part of the island. The team was temporarily based in Ayioi Omoloyites, Nicosia. Olimpiada Neapolis FC FC is part of Olimpiada Neapolis.

Honours

Football
Cypriot Fourth Division
Winner (1): 1989-90 (Nicosia-Keryneia Group)

References

1951 establishments in Cyprus
Defunct football clubs in Cyprus